U. formosa may refer to:

 Uluella formosa, a jumping spider
 Urophora formosa, a fruit fly